Samuel Pasco (June 28, 1834March 13, 1917) was an American politician who served as a U.S. Senator from Florida.

Biography
Pasco was born in London, England, to a family of Cornish ancestry. His family moved to Prince Edward Island in 1841 before moving to the United States in 1843 and settling in Charlestown, Massachusetts. Pasco attended Harvard University and then moved to Florida in 1859. He served as principal of the Waukeenah Academy, a school in Monticello, Florida, from 1860 to 1861.

When the American Civil War began, though he had only lived in the South for two years, Pasco joined the army of the Confederate States of America. He fought as a member of the 3rd Florida Infantry Regiment. He was captured in Mississippi and imprisoned by the United States for the rest of the war. He was released in March 1865 and immediately returned to Florida to resume his post as principal of the Waukeenah Academy. He resigned from that position in 1866 but remained in Florida, serving as clerk of Jefferson County from 1866 to 1868. He eventually became a prominent lawyer in the area.

In 1885, he was the president of the convention which wrote a new constitution for Florida. He was a member of the Florida House of Representatives from 1886 to 1887 and briefly served as speaker in 1887.

In 1887, Pasco was elected to the U.S. Senate from Florida, as a member of the Democratic Party. He served in the Senate for two terms, until 1899, when he was defeated for reelection. He then became a member of the Isthmian Canal Commission, which decided that a canal should be built through the isthmus of Panama. He remained on this commission until 1905, when work on the canal began.

Pasco then retired from public life and moved back to Monticello. He died in Tampa, Florida, and was buried in the Roseland cemetery in Monticello. Pasco County, Florida, is named for him.

See also
List of United States senators from Florida
United States congressional delegations from Florida
List of United States senators born outside the United States

References

Sources
 Retrieved on 2008-02-14

1834 births
1917 deaths
Harvard University alumni
Foreign Confederate military personnel
Confederate States Army soldiers
English emigrants to the United States
Democratic Party United States senators from Florida
Speakers of the Florida House of Representatives
Democratic Party members of the Florida House of Representatives
American educators
Florida lawyers
19th-century American politicians
People from Monticello, Florida
American people of Cornish descent
19th-century American lawyers